Bernard Waldemar Marszałek (1975 – 30 April 2007) was a powerboat driver from Poland who was the son of six-time world champion Waldemar Marszałek. Bernard won the O-350 World Championship in 2003. He was a candidate for the Polish Deputy Minister of Sport but died of an asthma attack in 2007, age 31.

References

External links

http://www.powerboats.janikowo.com/
http://formulaseries.net/main/

1976 births
2007 deaths
Polish motorboat racers
Deaths from asthma
Sportspeople from Warsaw
Date of birth missing
Place of birth missing